Non-invasive glucose monitoring refers to the measurement of blood glucose levels (required by people with diabetes to prevent both chronic and acute complications from the disease) without drawing blood, puncturing the skin, or causing pain or trauma. The search for a successful technique began about 1975 and has continued to the present without a clinically or commercially viable product. , only one such product had been approved for sale by the FDA, based on a technique for electrically pulling glucose through intact skin, and it was withdrawn after a short time owing to poor performance and occasional damage to the skin of users.

Hundreds of millions of dollars have been invested in companies who have sought the solution to this long-standing problem. Approaches that have been tried include near infrared spectroscopy (measuring glucose through the skin using light of slightly longer wavelengths than the visible region), transdermal measurement (attempting to pull glucose through the skin using either chemicals, electricity or ultrasound), measuring the amount that polarized light is rotated by glucose in the front chamber of the eye (containing the aqueous humor), and many others. 

A 2012 study reviewed ten technologies: bioimpedance spectroscopy, microwave/RF sensing, fluorescence technology, mid-infrared spectroscopy, near infrared spectroscopy, optical coherence tomography, optical polarimetry, raman spectroscopy, reverse iontophoresis, and ultrasound technology, concluding with the observation that none of these had produced a commercially available, clinically reliable device and that therefore, much work remained to be done.

, disregarding the severe shortcomings mentioned above, at least one non-invasive glucose meter was being marketed in a number of countries. Still, as the mean absolute deviation of this device was nearly 30% in clinical trials, 'further research efforts were desired to significantly improve the accuracy [...]'.

While multiple technologies have been tried, Raman Spectroscopy has gained traction as one promising technology for measuring glucose in interstitial fluid. Early attempts include C8 Medisensors   and the Laser Biomedical Research Center at MIT (Massachusetts Institute of Technology) which have been working on a Raman spectroscopy sensor for more than 20 years and conducting clinical investigations in collaboration with the Clinical Research Center at University of Missouri – Columbia.
In 2018 a paper in PLOS ONE  showed independent validation data from a clinical investigation comprising 15 subjects with diabetes mellitus type 1 with a Mean absolute relative difference (MARD) of 25.8%. The system used, was a custom-built confocal Raman setup.
In 2019 researchers at the Samsung Advanced Institute of Technology (SAIT), Samsung Electronics, in collaboration with the Laser Biomedical Research Center  Massachusetts Institute of Technology (MIT) developed a new approach based on Raman spectroscopy that allowed them to see the glucose signal directly. The researchers tested the system in pigs and could get accurate glucose readings for up to an hour after initial calibration.

In 2020, German  Institute for Diabetes-Technology have published data from 15 subjects with type 1 diabetes on a new prototype GlucoBeam based on Raman spectroscopy from RSP Systems Denmark. Showing a MARD of 23.6% on independent validation in out-patient setup with up till 8 days without recalibration.

With accuracy on marketed BGM devices in the US between 5.6 and 20.8%.  A NIGM solution would likely need to have an accuracy with a MARD below 20% to be widely accepted.

The number of clinical trials of non-invasive glucose monitors has grown throughout the 21st century. While the National Institutes of Health recorded only 4 clinical investigations of the technology from 2000 to 2015, there were 16 from 2016 to 2020.

References 

Blood tests
Diabetes-related supplies and medical equipment
Medical monitoring equipment